Beaumetz-lès-Cambrai is a commune in the Pas-de-Calais department in the Hauts-de-France region in northern France.

Geography

Population

Sights
 The church of St. Géri, rebuilt, like most of the village, after 1918.
 Vestiges of an old castle.
 Two World War I cemeteries.

See also
Communes of the Pas-de-Calais department

References

External links

The cemetery at Beaumetz-lès-Cambrai
The cemetery at Beaumetz crossroads

Communes of Pas-de-Calais